In the Silence is the second studio album of Icelandic singer-songwriter Ásgeir (known name Ásgeir Trausti, full name Ásgeir Trausti Einarsson) and is his first all-English album.

The album includes the same tracklist as his highly successful debut album Dýrð í dauðaþögn in the Icelandic language, but with translated or new English-language lyrics by John Grant (from original lyrics in Icelandic by Einar Georg Einarsson, Ásgeir's father).

The album has charted in Belgium and the Netherlands and the debut single, "Going Home", has charted in France.

Track listing

Bonus tracks

Charts

Year-end charts

References

2013 albums
Ásgeir Trausti albums